Central Siberian Botanic Garden is a botanic garden in the south-eastern part of Novosibirsk, Russia. It borders with Akademgorodok.

History
Until 1964, the garden was located in Zayeltsovsky City District and covered an area of 232 hectares.

Since 1964, CSBG is located in Akademgorodok.

Description
Central Siberian Botanic Garden is a center of botanical and ecological research.

Fauna

Birds
 Black kite
 Common buzzard
 Eurasian sparrowhawk
 Northern goshawk
 European honey buzzard
 Ural owl
 Great grey owl
 Long-eared owl
 Boreal owl

Mammals
Squirrels, chipmunks, beavers, hares, weasels, foxes and other animals inhabit the garden.

Flora

References

External links
 Central Siberian Botanic Garden. Official website.

Tourist attractions in Novosibirsk
Sovetsky District, Novosibirsk
Botanical gardens in Russia
Research institutes in Novosibirsk